FNB Field is a baseball park in Harrisburg, Pennsylvania, on City Island in the Susquehanna River. It is the home field of the Harrisburg Senators, the Double-A Eastern League affiliate of the Washington Nationals, and was the home stadium of Penn FC of the USL. The original structure was built in 1987 and it was called Riverside Stadium until 2004. It has a capacity of 6,187. The ballpark received a $45 million renovation that began in 2008.

History
FNB Field sits on the exact spot where baseball had been played earlier in the century, where other Harrisburg teams played from 1907 to 1952. The location, City Island, is a 62-acre waterfront park and sports complex. The facilities include volleyball courts, softball fields, a football/soccer field, water golf, nature tails, jogging paths, cycling paths, two marinas, the Pride of the Susquehanna paddlewheel riverboat, a food court called RiverSide Village, and a miniature train that runs around the island for tours.

The original ballpark is a steel and aluminum structure, and over the course of time, additional seating areas were built along first base, and box seats in foul territory and in front of the grandstands behind home plate to provide additional seating, despite official capacity being listed at over 6,000 since the park's inception. The stadium was used as the spring training facility in the movie Major League II, starring Charlie Sheen, Tom Berenger and Corbin Bernsen.

Stadium renovation

FNB Field received a $45 million renovation ($18 million in city funding). Originally the renovation was scheduled to begin in 2005. However, problems with the availability of state funding for the project pushed it back to 2008, with the transfer of ownership between the 2007 and 2008 seasons. The renovation project was finished in two phases, with the first phase being completed before Opening Day 2009. The second phase of the project began in August 2009 and was completed prior to Opening Day 2010.

The construction for the first phase of the project began in January 2009 and continued into April 2009. The changes and additions to FNB Field for the 2009 season were:

A public plaza and entrance was constructed in the left field corner; a boardwalk surrounding the outfield was constructed between the foul poles; a complete upgrade to the scoreboard; a new left field seating area; an outfield bar complete with drink rails; and new seating underneath the scoreboard; a new outfield wall constructed with static advertisement panels; and a new  Operations Building which houses the Senators front offices, ranger, security, first aid and the new box office along with the new Senators souvenir store, concession stand, and public rest rooms.

The second phase of the construction project began in August 2009. This project included the comprehensive changes to FNB Field that turned the stadium on City Island into one of the best and most unusual ballparks in minor league baseball. The following is a comprehensive list of the renovation project:

 Complete new seating bowl upgrades with individual chair back seats replacing the bench seating
 Roofing covering the majority of the seating bowl
 Construction of 20 suites with amenities including a glass wall located in the front of the suite to see the field and a in the back of the suite to see the city skyline
 A new sound system
 Creation of a "Midway" with activities and specialty areas geared towards children, teenagers and families
 Completion of new concessions and restrooms on elevated concourses
 Upgraded picnic areas which effectively double the size of the stadium picnic facilities
 Reconfiguration of field lights including removal of two lights, addition of fixtures to remaining eight lights, re-lamp and re-aim of all lights, addition of quartz lighting bank for emergency purposes
 Upgrade of the field-level concourse with brick pavers
 Completion of the Operations Building by August 2009
 New press box including new media and scoreboard control rooms
 Complete renovation of existing buildings, including the home and visitors clubhouses and the restroom facilities
 Development of a reserved parking lot.

The total construction costs for the project were $32 million and the total development budget for the entire project, including all costs, was approximately $45 million. Prior to the 2005 season, a new playing surface was installed which is also a part of the $45 million total project cost.

In the 2008 off-season, the renovation of the stadium began, with $500,000 in funding going towards a new public plaza, and other small amenities to be built into the stadium. In the 2009 offseason, the rest of the stadium was renovated.

Stadium dimensions

The ballpark's original dimensions were fairly basic. Anything that hit the billboards was a home run. With the renovation of the park, and the addition of the boardwalk, some of the distances have changed, with left and right field now 325 feet from home plate. Center field's distance has stayed the same at 400 feet; however walls, unlike at left and right field, were raised to 16 feet instead of the original 8 feet, and the walls have extra bends that did not exist in the previous setup, predominantly in left center and right center field.

Foul territory also currently varies, because there is a small amount of foul ground behind home plate. However, the further out toward the outfield, the wall on the foul ground stays somewhat parallel to the foul line in both left and right field, with only the box seats sticking out into foul ground helping to reduce the area somewhat. This was expected to change when the main grandstands are renovated in the 2009–2010 off-season. The bullpens were also located out in the foul territory by the outfield walls. While the visiting team's bullpen has stayed in the same place for the 2009 season, and is expected to be in the same general area for the 2010 season, the Senators moved their bullpen to a location behind the right field wall halfway through the season.

Trivia
 Because of the location, FNB Field is prone to flooding and a previous stadium at the site was washed out by a flood in 1935. Floods in the winter do not pose as much of a problem, as the ballpark can be repaired and ready for the next season, but floods during the baseball season can (and usually will) affect the Senators' schedule, forcing them to play their "home games" usually at their opponent's ballpark. In the 2006 season when a flood partially submerged the field, and forced the Senators to play two "home games" as a doubleheader in Bowie against the Bowie Baysox. The most recent episode of this was during the 2011 playoffs when a flood completely submerged the field and forced the Senators to play their first two playoff "home games" in Richmond against the Richmond Flying Squirrels. Even though the Senators had the best record in the Eastern League, they went on to lose all three games in Richmond and were eliminated from the playoffs.
 The record attendance at a Senators' game at FNB Field is 8,637, on September 1, 2011. The crowd was bolstered by a rehab start for Stephen Strasburg, while future Hall of Famer  Iván Rodríguez caught for him, and the Senators' clinching of the division title.

References

External links

FNB Field Views - Ball Parks of the Minor Leagues
Photographs of FNB Field - Rochester Area Ballparks

Buildings and structures in Harrisburg, Pennsylvania
Sports in Harrisburg, Pennsylvania
Sports venues in Pennsylvania
Sports venues in Harrisburg, Pennsylvania
Baseball venues in Pennsylvania
Minor league baseball venues
Populous (company) buildings
Eastern League (1938–present) ballparks
 Sports venues completed in 1987